The Men's 800m freestyle event at the 2010 South American Games was held on March 26, with the slow heat at 10:12 and the fast heat at 18:06.

Medalists

Records

Results

Final

References
Final

Freestyle 800m M